The Franz Senn Hut is a large and very popular Category I alpine hut in the Stubai Alps owned by the Austrian Alpine Club (Österreichischer Alpenverein). It is a large, well-appointed hut, named after Franz Senn. Access is from Oberiss in the Oberbergtal off the Stubaital above Neustift.

History 
The Franz Senn Hut was opened on 15 September 1885 having cost 3,000 florins. At the time it had accommodation for 37 people including 4 women. It was extended in 1907/08 to 20 beds and 60 shakedowns and again in 1932/33 to 80 beds and 80 sleeping places. During the Second World War a goods cableway was erected. In 1960 the hut's capacity was increased to 220.

The hut was named after a mountaineering pastor.

Access 
 By train: to Innsbruck from there to Fulpmes (on the Stubai Valley railway) and from there by bus
 By bus: to Neustift im Stubaital, village of Milders
 By car: to Neustift im Stubaital

Ascent 
 Neustift im Stubaital (1154 metre climb, duration: c. 4½ hours)
 Oberiss Alm (402 metre climb, duration: c. 1½ hours)

Summits accessible from the Franz Senn Hut 
 Ruderhofspitze (3,474 m), height difference 1327 m, duration c. 5 hours, high tour)
 Lisenerspitze (3,230 m, height difference 1080 m, duration c. 3.5 hours, glacier tour)
 Lisenser Fernerkogel (3,266 m, height difference 1150 m, duration c. 4.5 hours, glacier tour)
 Schafgrübler (2,921 m, height difference 780 m, duration c. 3 hours)
 Rinnenspitze (3,003 m, height difference 850 m, duration 2.5 to 3 hours, sections of the summit ridge are secured)
 Östliche Seespitze (3,416 m), popular but challenging ski tour
 Westliche Seespitze (3,355 m)
 Wildes Hinterbergl, (3,288 m), much frequented ski tour

Transits 
The hut is on the Stubai Hohenweg, an 8-day high level trail around the Stubai; neighbouring huts on the trail are the Starkenburger Hut and the New Regensburg Hut.

Huts 

 Amberger Hut (2,135 m, duration: c. 6 hours)
 Neue Regensburger Hut (2,286 m, duration: c. 4 hours auf dem Stubaier Höhenweg)
 Starkenburger Hut (2,237 m, duration: c. 7 hours auf dem Stubaier Höhenweg
 Adolf Pichler Hut (1,977 m, duration: c. 7 hours)
 Westfalenhaus (2,273 m, duration: c. 6 hours)
 Potsdamer Hut (2,020 m, duration: 5–7 hours)

Places 
 Neustift im Stubaital (993 m, duration: c. 4½ hours)

See also 
 Pic of the hut at dusk
 Pic up valley

References

External links 
 Official website

Mountain huts in Tyrol (state)